The music of Assam consists various genres of folk and modern music, drawing its artistic basis from the history of Assam, from Assamese culture and its ancient traditions. In recent times, starting from the late eighties, popular artistes have modernized the music catering to local popular demand.

A basic characteristic of the indigenous ethnic music of Assam is its descending scale similar to East Asian music which distinguishes it from the Mode-based or folk music (Raaga-based) forms from the rest of India.

The tunes are structured in a pyramid and are always in pentatonic scale similar to other traditional music of Asia like China, Mongolia etc and dissimilar from the seven-scaled Indian music, (in contrast to the music of rest of India which is Meend based), such as the Bihu songs, (common in South-East Asia and East Asia) besides languorous music of other forms.

The legend of Princess Usha of Sonitpur and her cohort Chitralekha also enlighten us on the musical expertise of the Assamese women. 
The connoisseurs however, have divided the classical Assamese music into two parts – Borgeet and Ojapali. The composers of Borgeets, Sankardev and his disciple Madhavdev added versatility to Assamese music.

Musical genres

Devotional
Vivek
Dihanaam
Harinaam

Indigenous Traditional Folk
Bihu
Bhawaiya

Popular
Goalpariya Lokogeet
Kamrupi Lokgeet
Ojapali
Tokari Geet

Musical instruments

Bahi
Sifung
Bihu or Uja Dhul
Tukari
Dotara
Gogona
Khol
Mridongo
Nagara
Pepa
Taal
Xutuli
Doba
Xinga
Bor Tal
Bin
Paat
Toka
Kham
Kham
Muri
Pati Dhul
Joi Dhul
Bor Dhul
Dhepa Dhul
Kahlia
Toka 
Xinga
Bortaal 
Huluxi
Hutulietc other indigenous musical instruments

Early contributors to Assamese music
Ambikagiri Raichoudhury
Anima Choudhury
Bishnuprasad Rabha
Bhupen Hazarika
Dipali Barthakur
Jayanta Hazarika
Jyoti Prasad Agarwala
Khagen Mahanta
Madhavdeva
Parvati Prasad Baruva
Pratima Baruah
Rameshwar Pathak
Sankardev
 Moghai Oja
 Tarulota Bori Mili

Other notable composers, musicians and singers
Angaraag Mahanta
Anurag Saikia
Axl Hazarika
Beauty Sharma Barua
Dhrubajyoti Phukan
Dipak Sarma
Jim Ankan Deka
Jitul Sonowal
Joi Barua
Kalpana Patowary
Mayukh Hazarika
Nirmalendu Choudhury
Queen Hazarika
Rameshwar Pathak
Rudra Baruah
Tarali Sarma
Ayaan Anisur
Zubeen Garg

References

 Phukan, Mitra (2003) Musical Identity and being an Assamese, October 2003.
 Assam Portal

 
Assam